Katherine Patricia Ruth is an American beauty queen. Ruth is the 1978 Miss International.

Career 
On November 10, 1978, Ruth represented United States in the Miss International 1978 pageant that was held at the Mielparque in Tokyo, Japan and won the Miss International title.

References

External links
 Katherine Ruth at aparchive.com

Miss International winners
Living people
Year of birth missing (living people)
American beauty pageant winners
Miss International 1978 delegates